is a junction passenger railway station located in the city of Nagahama, Shiga, Japan, operated by the West Japan Railway Company (JR West). It is the northernmost station in Shiga Prefecture

Lines

Station layout
The station consists of two island platforms built on an embankment, connected to the station building by an underground passage. The station is staffed.

Platforms

History
Ōmi-Shiotsu Station opened on 1 October 1957 under the Japan National Railways (JNR). The station came under the aegis of the West Japan Railway Company (JR West) on 1 April 1987 due to the privatization of JNR.

Station numbering was introduced in March 2018 with Ōmi-Shiotsu being assigned station number JR-A03 for the Hokuriku Main Line and JR-B08 for the Kosei Line.

Passenger statistics
In fiscal 2019, the station was used by an average of 207 passengers daily (boarding passengers only).

Surrounding area
The station is surrounded by mountains on three sides, with Japan National Route 8 passing in front of the station. Nagahama City Shiotsu Elementary School is in the vicinity.

Gallery

See also
List of railway stations in Japan

References

External links

JR West official home page

Railway stations in Shiga Prefecture
Railway stations in Japan opened in 1957
Hokuriku Main Line
Kosei Line
Nagahama, Shiga